Li Jinbin (born February 1958) is a Chinese politician who has served as the Communist Party Secretary of Anhui since 2016. Originally from Sichuan province, Li spent his early career in Jilin province. He was Vice-Governor of Jilin from 2002 to 2007. He then worked briefly in Shaanxi before being transferred to Anhui to take on increasingly senior leadership roles.

Biography
Li Jinbin was born in February 1958 in Chengdu, Sichuan province. He joined the work force in December 1974, and the Communist Party of China in September 1978. He has a doctoral degree in law.

Li spent much of his career in Jilin province in Northeast China. He worked at the education bureau of Jilin, before serving as Deputy Communist Party Chief of Changchun, the provincial capital. He later served as Mayor of Tonghua city and Party Chief of Liaoyuan city. He became Vice-Governor of Jilin province in August 2002. From 2002 to 2007 he studied at the graduate school of Jilin University on a part-time basis.

In 2007, Li was appointed director of the Organization Department of the Shaanxi party committee. Beginning in 2013, Li experienced a series of rapid promotions. In April that year, he was appointed Deputy Party Secretary of Anhui province. On 8 June 2015, he became Acting Governor of Anhui, succeeding Wang Xuejun, who had been promoted to provincial party chief; he was confirmed as governor on July 28. Just over a year later, in August 2016, Li was elevated again to provincial party chief, again succeeding Wang Xuejun. Although it was considered conventional practice for a sitting governor to advance to the party chief position, the rapid pace of the promotions between 2013 and 2016 was notable.

On 23 October 2021, he was appointed vice chairperson of the National People's Congress Environment Protection and Resources Conservation Committee.

References

Living people
1958 births
Chinese Communist Party politicians from Sichuan
People's Republic of China politicians from Sichuan
Governors of Anhui
Politicians from Chengdu
Political office-holders in Jilin
Political office-holders in Shaanxi
Mayors of places in China
Jilin University alumni
Members of the 19th Central Committee of the Chinese Communist Party
Delegates to the 12th National People's Congress
Delegates to the 9th National People's Congress